Conus diegoi is a species of sea snail, a marine gastropod mollusc in the family Conidae, the cone snails, cone shells or cones.

These snails are predatory and venomous. They are capable of "stinging" humans.

Description
The size of the shell attains 13 mm.

Distribution
This species occurs in the Atlantic Ocean off Boa Vista Island, Cape Verde.

References

 Puillandre N., Duda T.F., Meyer C., Olivera B.M. & Bouchet P. (2015). One, four or 100 genera? A new classification of the cone snails. Journal of Molluscan Studies. 81: 1-23

External links
 To World Register of Marine Species
 

diegoi
Gastropods described in 2014
Fauna of Boa Vista, Cape Verde
Gastropods of Cape Verde